Santa Maria del Rosario alle Pigne (or del Rosariello) is a church located near Piazza Cavour in Naples, Italy.

History
The church acquired its name, because in 1638, the zone where the church now stands was a pine forest. The trees were felled to build the convent on lands that belonged to the Moscabruno clan. Designs of the church were by Arcangelo Guglielmelli. It has a rectangular base with lateral chapels. The facade has a statue of the Virgin and Child by the artist. The cupola is built from tufa rock. The church has works by Luca Giordano. The adjacent cloister is built in a late Renaissance style. The church has undergone recent renovation.

Bibliography
Vincenzo Regina, Le chiese di Napoli. Viaggio indimenticabile attraverso la storia artistica, architettonica, letteraria, civile e spirituale della Napoli sacra, Newton and Compton editor, Naples 2004.

External links

Roman Catholic churches in Naples
Baroque architecture in Naples
17th-century Roman Catholic church buildings in Italy